Aulodesmus mossambicus is a species of millipedes belonging to the family Gomphodesmidae. This species can be found in Mozambique and Tanzania.

References

Polydesmida
Millipedes of Africa